Dale Fritz (born ) is an Australian former rugby league footballer who played in the 1980s, 1990s and 2000s.

Playing career
Fritz played for the Illawarra Steelers, the Western Suburbs Magpies, Western Reds and the North Queensland Cowboys in Australia.  In the later stages of his career, Fritz played in the Super League for the Castleford Tigers (Heritage № 761).

Post playing
Fritz is currently a strength and conditioning coach at the Western Suburbs Magpies.

References

Sources
 

1969 births
Living people
Australian rugby league players
Castleford Tigers players
Illawarra Steelers players
North Queensland Cowboys players
Rugby league five-eighths
Rugby league locks
Western Reds players
Western Suburbs Magpies players
Place of birth missing (living people)